Mobilicoccus caccae is a Gram-negative, facultatively anaerobic and motile bacterium from the genus of Mobilicoccus which has been isolated from the feces of a primate (Rhinopithecus roxellana) from the Yunnan Wild Animal Park, Yunnan Province, China.

References

External links
Type strain of Mobilicoccus caccae at BacDive -  the Bacterial Diversity Metadatabase

Micrococcales
Bacteria described in 2017